Katari Veera is a 1966 Indian Kannada-language swashbuckler film directed by Y. R. Swamy and produced by T. Vasanna and S. Heera. The film stars Dr. Rajkumar, Udaya Chandrika, Udaykumar, Narasimharaju , Balakrishna and Vanisri . This is the first Kannada film of actress Udaya Chandrika. This was also the debut movie of Nagappa - who went on to become one of the popular villains of his time. The film has musical score by Upendra Kumar who also made his debut in Kannada movies through this movie.

Cast

Dr. Rajkumar
Udaykumar
Narasimharaju
Balakrishna
Rathnakar
Nagappa
Kuppuraj
Nagappa
Srikanth
Shyamsundar
D. T. Shashiraj
Udaya Chandrika
Vanisri
Shobharani alias Shymala Shetty
Papamma
Baby Sunitha
Vidyashree
Janaki

Soundtrack
The music was composed by Upendra Kumar. The song "Changu Changendu Haaruva", sung by P. Susheela is a huge hit.

References

External links
 

1966 films
1960s Kannada-language films
Films directed by Y. R. Swamy